Yunjinlu station, is a station of Line 2 of the Nanjing Metro. It started operations on 28 May 2010 along with the rest of Line 2.

Known as Chating station during planning stages, it was renamed Yunjinlu station in 2007 to promote the accession of yunjin (brocade), a product characteristic of Nanjing, to the UNESCO Intangible Cultural Heritage Lists. The station is decorated with a Qingming theme.

Around the station
 Nanjing Massacre Memorial Hall

References

Railway stations in Jiangsu
Railway stations in China opened in 2010
Nanjing Metro stations